Wacław Zagórski, nom-de-guerre "Lech Grzybowski" (1909–1982) was a Polish lawyer, soldier, a participant in the Warsaw Uprising with the rank of captain and a commander in the famous Chrobry II Battalion. He was decorated with the Order of Virtuti Militari 5th Class in 1944.

References

 Muzeum Powstania Warszawskiego (Museum of the Warsaw Uprising), 

1909 births
1982 deaths
Lawyers from Warsaw
Warsaw Uprising insurgents
Recipients of the Silver Cross of the Virtuti Militari
20th-century  Polish lawyers